James McGuigan (1 March 1924 – 30 March 1988) was a Scottish professional football player and manager.

Career

Playing career
McGuigan, who played as a wing half, played junior football with Bonnyrigg Rose Athletic, before turning professional in 1946 with Hamilton Academical. After just one season in the Scottish Football League, McGuigan moved to England, playing in the Football League for Sunderland, Stockport County, Crewe Alexandra and Rochdale. McGuigan made a total of 334 League appearances between 1946 and 1959, scoring 48 goals.

Coaching career
After retiring as a player in 1959, McGuigan became a coach at former club Crewe Alexandra, before becoming manager in March 1960. After leaving Crewe in 1964, he later managed Grimsby Town, Chesterfield, Rotherham United and Stockport County. At Chesterfield, McGuigan won the 1969-70 Fourth Division title; he won the Manager of the Year award the same year.

Managerial stats

References

1924 births
1988 deaths
Scottish footballers
Scottish football managers
Bonnyrigg Rose Athletic F.C. players
Hamilton Academical F.C. players
Sunderland A.F.C. players
Stockport County F.C. players
Crewe Alexandra F.C. players
Rochdale A.F.C. players
Scottish Football League players
English Football League players
Crewe Alexandra F.C. managers
Grimsby Town F.C. managers
Chesterfield F.C. managers
Rotherham United F.C. managers
Stockport County F.C. managers
English Football League managers
Association football wing halves
Sheffield United F.C. non-playing staff
Footballers from West Lothian
Scottish Junior Football Association players